James Robert Rhind, architect, was born in Inverness, Scotland in 1854 and trained as an architect in his father's local practice.

He was successful in the architectural competition for new libraries to be constructed in Glasgow following Andrew Carnegie’s gift of £100,000 to the city in 1901. His designs were selected for 7 libraries, allowing him to demonstrate his individual interpretation of  Edwardian Baroque architecture.

Rhind’s libraries were all built with locally quarried sandstone, which blended in with the existing tenement neighbourhoods. His landmark buildings were greatly enhanced by his liberal use of columns, domes and sculpted features. Many of the façades were decorated with stone and bronze statues by the noted Glasgow sculptor, William Kellock Brown.
 
Rhind retained his base in Inverness while he temporarily occupied offices in Glasgow city centre during the construction of the new Carnegie libraries. In Scotland the Carnegie libraries were typically built of stone. In the rest of the British Isles there was much more use of brick.  The drawings of the Carnegie libraries designed by architect James Robert Rhind are in the Strathclyde Archives, Glasgow.

Works

 Bridgeton District Library, 1903-1906
 Dennistoun Library, 1903-1906
 Govanhill & Crosshill District Library, 1902-1906
 Hutchesontown District Library, 1904-1906
 Maryhill Public Library, 1903-1905
 Parkhead District Library, 1904-1906
 Woodside Library, 1902-1905

Rhind's best known buildings in the north of Scotland are the Royal Golf Hotel, Dornoch and the Crown Church, Inverness.

References

External links
James Robert Rhind (1854-1918) - contains a biography of James. R. Rhind
Edwardian Baroque Architecture in Glasgow – James. R. Rhind 

Scottish architects
Baroque Revival architects
1854 births
1918 deaths
People associated with Glasgow
People from Inverness